Magno Macedo Novaes (born 30 March 1983) is a Brazilian former professional footballer who played as a goalkeeper.

Career
Born in São Paulo, Novaes arrived in France in 2005, where he played in the third-tier Championnat National for AS Moulins and AC Arles-Avignon. In 2008, he joined SC Bastia of Ligue 2.

Novaes played all but two games as the Corsicans won the third division in 2010–11. A year later, they won promotion to Ligue 1 as champions and he was named Goalkeeper of the Year at the Trophées UNFP du football. However, veteran Frenchman Mickaël Landreau was preferred for the 2012–13 Ligue 1 season, and at its conclusion the Brazilian signed a two-year deal at Valenciennes FC also in the top flight.

At Valenciennes, Novaes was not first choice, including after relegation to Ligue 2, and also played occasionally for the reserve team in the fifth tier. In January 2015, he was loaned to third-tier Amiens SC for the rest of the season.

In October 2015, Novaes signed for AS Béziers for the rest of the Championnat National season. He played all but three games in 2017–18 as they won promotion as runners-up to Red Star F.C., but in the ensuing Ligue 2 season he was absent with a knee injury from October to February, the first such absence of his career.

Coaching career
After his retirement in the summer 2020, Novaes was hired as goalkeeper coach at Béziers. After manager Colbert Marlot was fired on 15 November 2021, Novaes was named caretaker manager. Novaes was in charge for three games (2 victories, 1 defeat), before he was replaced by Alain Nègre on 14 December 2021. Novaes then continued in his original position as goalkeeper coach.

References

External links
 
 
 Magno Macedo Novaes at Foot National
 Career summary by playerhistory.com

1983 births
Living people
Brazilian footballers
Association football goalkeepers
Ligue 1 players
Ligue 2 players
Championnat National players
Championnat National 3 players
AS Moulins players
AC Arlésien players
SC Bastia players
Valenciennes FC players
Amiens SC players
AS Béziers (2007) players
Brazilian expatriate footballers
Brazilian expatriate sportspeople in France
Expatriate footballers in France
Footballers from São Paulo
Brazilian football managers
AS Béziers (2007) managers